Robert Eugene Bass (January 28, 1929 – August 17, 2018) was an American basketball coach and executive who worked in college basketball, the American Basketball Association (ABA), and the National Basketball Association (NBA).

Early life
Bass was born in Oklahoma in January 28, 1929. He studied at Tulsa Rogers High School in Oklahoma. He attended Oklahoma Baptist University in 1947, where he served as captain of the basketball team until his graduation in 1950. He later did study at University of Oklahoma, where he graduated with a master's degree.

Basketball career

Coaching
Bass served as the head basketball coach at Oklahoma Baptist for 15 years and was named the NAIA Coach of the Year in 1967. He led the Bison to the National Finals in 1965. The following year, his team won the 1966 NAIA national title. They returned to the Finals once more in 1967.

Bass' professional coaching career started with the Denver Rockets (now the Denver Nuggets) of the American Basketball Association in 1967, which he coached for two seasons. In 1969, Bass was hired as head coach of the Texas Tech Red Raiders replacing Gene Gibson. Bass cited a challenge to return to the college game and a distaste for the long pro season and its demands on his time away from family for accepting the position of head coach at Texas Tech. 

In his first season, the Red Raiders posted a 14–10 record under Bass and finished third in the Southwest Conference (SWC) regular season standings. The 1969–70 team posted the first winning season for the Red Raiders in four years.

On January 15, 1971, Bass resigned to take the same position with The Floridians of the American Basketball Association after coaching the first 13 games of the 1970–71 Red Raiders season; assistant coach Gerald Myers was named interim head coach (he would be hired on a full-time basis for Tech until 1991). The following day, Bass served as coach for The Floridians in their 123–119 win over the Utah Stars in Miami.

He coached The Floridians of the ABA for two years before the team folded at the end of the 1972 season. The next season, he coached the Memphis Tams.

28 games into the 1974-75 ABA season, Bass was hired by the San Antonio Spurs to replace Tom Nissalke. Bass energized crowds with his team's style of "schoolyard basketball". George Gervin credited Bass as important to his career, once stating that he was "a Hall of Famer because of him."; Bass changed Gervin's role on the team from forward to being in the backcourt. Bass orchestrated a blockbluster trade for Larry Kenon in 1975. The Spurs survived the dissolution of the ABA and became part of the ABA–NBA merger in 1976. The Spurs were one win away from the ABA Finals in the 1976 ABA playoffs, losing to the New York Nets in seven games.

General manager
After the 1976 season, Bass moved into the Spurs' front office, assuming the role of general manager, with Doug Moe becoming head coach. He would, over the years with the team, assume coaching duties on an interim basis as needed—in 1980 (when Moe was fired), 1984, and 1992. He finished his coaching career with a 311–300 record. Various players that Bass acquired to play for the Spurs included David Robinson and Avery Johnson. Bass drafted David Robinson with the first overall pick in the 1987 NBA Draft despite knowing that Robinson, a graduate of the Naval Academy, had two years of military service to do before he could play basketball. Bass and the front office convinced Robinson to not re-enter the draft and stay with the Spurs. Bass made a trade for Terry Cummings before the start of the 1989-90 season to go along with the rookie Robinson and Maurice Cheeks. The result was that the Spurs went from 21 wins in the previous season to 56 wins. Bass won the NBA Executive of the Year Award after the year ended. In 20 seasons with the franchise, Bass saw the Spurs reach the postseason seventeen times with him serving as either coach, general manager or vice president of basketball operations. 

In May 1994, Bass left the Spurs to become general manager of the Charlotte Hornets to replace Dave Twardzik. He soon traded Alonzo Mourning for Glen Rice, Matt Geiger, Khalid Reeves and a 1996 first-round draft pick. After a middling 1995-96 season, he fired Allan Bristow and replaced him with Dave Cowens. He traded for players such as Vlade Divac on the day of the NBA draft and sent Larry Johnson (who had signed a twelve-year deal in 1993) to the New York Knicks for Anthony Mason and Brad Lohaus. The Hornets won 54 games (a franchise record) and Bass won his second Executive of the Year award. The Hornets moved to New Orleans in 2002, and Bass stayed with the team, which saw him draft David West with the 18th overall pick in the 2003 NBA Draft. Bass retired in 2004, having seen the Hornets never finish with a losing record under his tenure.

Personal life
In later years, Bass was diagnosed with Parkinson's disease. Bass suffered two strokes in August of 2018. He died in his home in San Antonio home on August 17, 2018 at the age of 89; he was survived by his wife of 68 years.

Head coaching record

College

Notes

References

External links
 Bass coaching record at BasketballReference.com

1929 births
2018 deaths
American men's basketball players
Basketball coaches from Oklahoma
Basketball players from Oklahoma
Charlotte Hornets executives
College men's basketball head coaches in the United States
Denver Rockets head coaches
Memphis Sounds coaches
Miami Floridians coaches
New Orleans Hornets executives
Oklahoma Baptist Bison baseball players
Oklahoma Baptist Bison basketball coaches
Oklahoma Baptist Bison basketball players
San Antonio Spurs executives
San Antonio Spurs head coaches
Sportspeople from Tulsa, Oklahoma
Texas Tech Red Raiders basketball coaches
University of Oklahoma alumni